This timeline of the history of piracy in the 1610s is a chronological list of key events involving pirates between 1610 and 1619.

Events

1610
By December - Word has reached England of Francis Verney and Jack Ward's conversion to Islam.
December 8 - The English pirate Peter Love, who had set up base in the Outer Hebrides, was betrayed by a confederate, tried for piracy, and executed in Scotland.
Unknown - Hendrik Brouwer sails for the Dutch East Indies commanding three ships for the Dutch East India Company.
Unknown - Henry Mainwaring is commissioned to capture Peter Easton.
Unknown - Easton blockades the Bristol Channel.

1611 

 Late Spring - Easton arrives off the coast of Cork with a squadron of ships requesting to parley.

1612 

 February - A general pardon of all pirates who are subjects of James I is announced
 November - James I issues a pardon in Easton's name if he is to return the Concorde to its previous owners.

1613 

 Early in the year - The Duke of Savoy declares Nice and Villefranche to be free ports and offering asylum for pirates.
 February 20 - Easton sails into Villefranche and meets with the Duke of Savoy, investing 100,000 crowns in return for annual income.

1614 

 June 4 - Mainwaring arrives in Newfoundland with a fleet of six ships.
 Late in the year - Louis XIII asks Simon Danseker to help negotiate with the pirates around Tunis.
 Unknown - Verney converts back to Catholicism to escape being a galley slave after being captured by a Sicilian corsair.

1615 

 February - Having agreed to Louis XIII's request, Danseker arrives in the Gulf of Tunis with two French ships.
 June - Mainwaring engages four Spanish men-of-war off the coast of Portugal and emerges successful.

1616 

 June 9 - Mainwaring is pardoned by James I.

1617 

 Walter Raleigh is pardoned by James I and sent on a second expedition in search of El Dorado.

1618 

 March 20 - Mainwaring is knighted at Woking.
 May 23 - The Thirty Years' War starts, causing a rise in piracy.
 October 29 - Raleigh is executed.
 Unknown - Piet Pieterszoon Hein is pressed into service by the Republic of Venice.
 Unknown - Robert Walsingham is captured in Ireland by the English.

Births

1615 

 After February - Simon Danseker

1618 

 Unknown - Pérez de Guzmán

Deaths

1610 

 November 9 - George Somers
 December 8 - Peter Love

1613 

 April - Neil MacLeod

1615 

 September 6 - Francis Verney

1618 

 January - Lawrence Kemys
 June 6 - James Lancaster
 September 24 - William Parker
 October 29 - Walter Raleigh

References 

Piracy by year
Piracy